Iserlia is a commune in Basarabeasca District, Moldova. It is composed of a four villages: Bogdanovca, Carabiber, Iserlia and Ivanovca.

References

Communes of Basarabeasca District